African Union (AU) member states have various forms of government. The Constitutive Act of the African Union makes no provision for what type of government a member state may or must have, but Article 30 states:
Governments which shall come to power through unconstitutional means shall not be allowed to participate in the activities of the Union.
This clause has only been applied to Mauritania after its 2005 coup d'état, to Madagascar as a result of the 2009 Malagasy political crisis and to Togo during its political crisis in April 2005.

Several political systems of governance are represented in the AU, including stable, competitive democracies (Botswana, Cape Verde), systems dominated by single parties, and even a failed state that exists in a de jure capacity (Somalia) and a government in exile (Western Sahara's Sahrawi Arab Democratic Republic.)

Monarchism and republicanism

At present, three sovereign monarchies are members of the African Union: Eswatini (ruled by King Mswati III, with Ntombi), Lesotho (ruled by King Letsie III), and Morocco (ruled by King Mohammed VI of Morocco). Lesotho is a constitutional monarchy, in which the king or queen serves a largely ceremonial function; he no longer possesses any executive authority and is proscribed from actively participating in political initiatives. According to the constitution, the leader of the majority party in the assembly automatically becomes prime minister; the monarch is hereditary, but, under the terms of the constitution which came into effect after the March 1993 election, the monarch is a "living symbol of national unity" with no executive or legislative powers; under traditional law the college of chiefs has the power to determine who is next in the line of succession, who shall serve as regent in the event that the successor is not of mature age, and may even depose the monarch. Eswatini (Swaziland) is an absolute monarchy, currently in the process of democratization. According to current Swazi law and custom, the monarch holds supreme executive, legislative, and judicial powers. The king ("Ngwenyama") is a hereditary leader, receiving assistance from a council of ministers and a national legislature. The senior queen ("Ndlovukati") is in charge of national rituals, and acts as regent if her counterpart Ngwenyama dies and the heir has not performed royal adulthood rituals or is indisposed. If the king's mother is no longer living, one of the king's wives may act as Ndlovukati. The king has constitutional protection from arrest and trial.

In several other African states there are subnational monarchs, but only a select few are vested with constitutional and\or legal powers, and therefore the majority of them are little more than traditional notables in practice. The Ashanti Confederacy in Ghana is led by Asantehene (King) Otumfuo Nana Osei Tutu II; the succession is decided by a series of councils of local nobles and other royal family members. KwaZulu-Natal (or Zululand) is led by the king of the Zulu Nation, currently Misuzulu Zulu. Although he does not hold any direct political power, he is provided a stipend by the government of South Africa, and holds considerable sway over more traditionalist Zulu people in the KwaZulu-Natal Province. Both the Asantehene and the Zulu monarch are part of complex networks of other kings and chiefs that constitutionally serve as traditional leaders of their respective countries.

Due to constitutional reform in Uganda in 1993, several traditional monarchies have been politically reconstituted by the government of Yoweri Museveni. These are:
Ankole: Omugabe Ntare VI
Buganda: Kabaka Muwenda Mutebi II and Nnabagereka Sylvia
Bunyoro: Omukama Iguru
Busoga: Kyabazinga Henry Wako Muloki
Toro: Omukama Rukidi IV
Elsewhere, in Botswana, the kgosis (or chieftains) of the various tribes are constitutionally empowered to serve as advisors within the national legislature as members of the Ntlo ya Dikgosi. Meanwhile, in Nigeria, the various traditional polities that currently exist are politically defined by way of the ceding of definite authority from the provincial governments, which in turn receive their powers to do so from a series of chieftaincy laws that have been legislatively created. Beyond this, residual powers are also derived by the Nigerian traditional rulers from both pre-existing customary laws and the remnants of the indirect rule policy of the colonial era.

Historically, there have been several monarchies throughout the African continent. Since decolonization, many have been abolished in favor of republics. The following African monarchies have existed in the twentieth century:
Kingdom of Burundi (abolished 1966)
Central African Empire (abolished 1979)
Congo Free State (annexed by Belgium, 1908)
Kingdom of Egypt (abolished 1953)
Empire of Ethiopia (abolished 1975)
Kingdom of Libya (abolished 1969)
Kingdom of Rwanda (abolished 1961)
Kingdom of Tunisia (abolished 1957)
Sultanate of Zanzibar (abolished 1964, currently a constituent of the United Republic of Tanzania)

Several African colonies were under the sovereignty of the King or Queen of the United Kingdom. Upon independence, several states became Dominions or Commonwealth realms, sharing their head of state with the United Kingdom. All have subsequently abolished the monarchy:
The Gambia (abolished 1970)
Ghana (abolished 1960)
Kenya (abolished 1964)
Malawi (abolished 1966)
Mauritius (abolished 1992)
Nigeria (abolished 1963)
Rhodesia (not recognized; abolished 1970)
Sierra Leone (abolished 1971)
Union of South Africa (abolished 1961)
Tanganyika (abolished 1962)
Uganda (abolished 1963)
In spite of this, several African states are affiliated with the Commonwealth of Nations:
Botswana
Cameroon
Eswatini (Swaziland)
The Gambia
Ghana
Kenya
Lesotho
Malawi
Mauritius
Mozambique
Namibia
Nigeria
Seychelles
Sierra Leone
South Africa
Tanzania
Uganda
Zambia

Form of government

There are several types of government systems in African politics:
in an absolute monarchy, the head of state and head of government is a monarch with unlimited legal authority,
in a constitutional monarchy, the monarch is a ceremonial figurehead who has few political competences,
in a presidential system, the president is the head of state and head of government,
in a semi-presidential system, the president and the prime minister share a number of competences,
in a parliamentary system, the president is a ceremonial figurehead who has few political competences
in a one-party state, there may be theoretical or legal protection for opposition parties, but there is no legitimate chance of a candidate outside the ruling party winning an election; often there are constitutional provisions protecting one-party dominance. While no AU state is constitutionally defined as such, the following are effectively one-party states:
Eritrea (People's Front for Democracy and Justice)
Western Sahara's (Polisario Front)
Even in other states with elections, actual opposition may not exist. The following have been or are considered dominant-party systems:
Angola (Popular Movement for the Liberation of Angola - Party of Labour)
Botswana (Botswana Democratic Party)
Cameroon (Cameroon People's Democratic Movement)
Chad (Patriotic Salvation Movement)
Republic of the Congo (Congolese Labour Party)
Djibouti (People's Rally for Progress)
Equatorial Guinea (Democratic Party of Equatorial Guinea)
Ethiopia (Ethiopian People's Revolutionary Democratic Front)
Gabon (Gabonese Democratic Party)
The Gambia (Alliance for Patriotic Reorientation and Construction)
Mozambique (Mozambican Liberation Front)
Namibia (South-West Africa People's Organisation)
Rwanda (Rwandese Patriotic Front)
Seychelles (Seychelles People's Progressive Front)
South Africa (African National Congress)
Sudan (National Congress Party)
Tanzania (Chama Cha Mapinduzi)
Zimbabwe (Zimbabwe African National Union – Patriotic Front)
in a military dictatorship, high-ranking military officials run the state with authoritarian rule.

The politics of Africa have been blighted by severe problems with corruption and nepotism, coups d'état, and civil war. Corruption is a severe problem in much of the continent, with the vast majority of African states ranking below a five out of ten in Transparency International's Corruption Perceptions Index. Five of the ten most corrupt governments are AU member states:
Angola (2.0)
Côte d'Ivoire (1.9)
Equatorial Guinea (1.9)
Nigeria (1.9)
Chad (1.7)

The following AU states are in ongoing wars, or have recently ceased hostilities:
Côte d'Ivoire: Ivorian Civil War, 2002–2011
Democratic Republic of the Congo: Ituri Conflict, since 1999, Second Congo War, 1998–2002
Senegal: Casamance Conflict, since 1988
Somalia: Somali Civil War, since 1991 certain regions are controlled by different warlords; autonomous internal states emerged (Jubaland, Puntland, Southwestern Somalia, Galmudug); Somaliland declared independence in 1991 but is not internationally recognized; since 2004, there is a new transitional parliamentary republican government.
Sudan: Chadian-Sudanese conflict, 2005–2006, part of the larger Darfur conflict in Darfur, Second Sudanese Civil War, 1983–2005, in Southern Sudan
Western Sahara: 2020-present Western Saharan clashes, a continuation of the Western Sahara conflict against Morocco's military occupation.
Libya: 2011 Libyan civil war and Second Libyan Civil War (2014–2020)
Mali: Northern Mali conflict, 2012–2015
Central African Republic: Central African Republic Bush War, 2004–2007 and Central African Republic conflict (2012–present)

Degree of self-governance

Forty-five of the African Union's member states are unitary states, which means that most of the competences lie with the central government and only minor or local issues are within the authority of regional governments. However, four states are federations (Comoros, Ethiopia, Nigeria, and Sudan) of states or regions with equal competences, Somalia's Transitional Federal Parliament is also a federation; Madagascar has devolved certain powers to its six provinces; and the United Republic of Tanzania is a federacy of Tanganyika and Zanzibar, the latter of which elects its own president for internal affairs. Former federations and confederations in Africa from the twentieth century include:
French West Africa (1904–1958)
French Equatorial Africa (1910–1960)
Federation of Rhodesia and Nyasaland (1953–1963)
Mali Federation (1959–1960)
Federal Republic of Cameroon (1961–1972)
Uganda (1962–1967)
Sénégambia Confederation (1982–1989)

Legislatures
A further distinction is the number of chambers in the national legislature; either with one or two houses. There is no clear trend towards either model , and there's also no real common factor which determines whether a country's legislature is unicameral or bicameral, except for the fact that federations and countries with strong regional differences or regional identities are normally bicameral to reflect the regions' interests in national bills.

The function and form of the houses vary widely; some are directly elected, others indirectly or appointed, some have legal provisions for minority representation, based either on ethnicity, religious affiliation, or gender. In Cameroon and Malawi, there are legally two houses, but only one is functional.

There are presently 34 unicameral legislatures and 19 bicameral legislatures in among AU member states.

Listed by form of government

Listed by type of legislature

See also
Enlargement of the African Union

References

 by political system
Member states by political system